Parliamentary elections were held in São Tomé and Príncipe on 12 October 2014, alongside regional and local elections. The result was a majority for the opposition Independent Democratic Action led by 2-time Prime Minister Patrice Trovoada, which won 33 of the 55 seats in the National Assembly.

Background
Following the 2010 election in which the Independent Democratic Action got a plurality, the government lost a vote of confidence midway through its term.

Electoral system
The 55 members of the National Assembly were elected by proportional representation in seven multi-member constituencies using the closed list system.

Conduct
The African Union Election Observation Mission (AUEOM) was tasked with monitoring the election. The 24-member mission was led by Angolan França Van-Dúnem, who said, after a meeting with President Manuel Pinto da Costa, the mission sought to ensure the election was run in order and peace. There was also an observation mission from the Community of Portuguese Language Countries (CPLP). The CPLP report stated that the elections were "transparent, free and fair, and were conducted in an orderly manner. It mentioned that there were some incidents, but that they were unlikely to affect the final results.

Results

References

Elections in São Tomé and Príncipe
Sao Tome
2014 in São Tomé and Príncipe
October 2014 events in Africa